It All Starts Today is a 1999 French drama film directed by Bertrand Tavernier. It was entered into the 49th Berlin International Film Festival where it won an Honourable Mention.

Plot
In a mining town which has been blighted by economic downturns, an elementary school headmaster struggles to obtain social services on behalf of his students.

Cast
 Philippe Torreton as Daniel Lefebvre
 Maria Pitarresi as Valeria
 Nadia Kaci as Samia Damouni
 Véronique Ataly as Mrs. Lienard
 Nathalie Bécue as Cathy
 Emmanuelle Bercot as Mrs. Tievaux
 Françoise Bette as Mrs. Delacourt
 Christine Citti as Mrs. Baudoin
 Christina Crevillén as Sophie
 Sylviane Goudal as Gloria
 Didier Bezace as Inspector
 Betty Teboulle as Mrs. Henry
 Gérard Giroudon as Mayor

References

External links

1999 films
French drama films
1990s French-language films
1999 drama films
Films directed by Bertrand Tavernier
Films featuring a Best Actor Lumières Award-winning performance
1990s French films